Gustaf Düben (also spelt Gustav) (1624/1628December 19, 1690) was a Swedish organist and composer.

Personal life

Early life 
Düben was born in the 1620s in Stockholm, Sweden, the son of the German-born Andreas Düben, an organist, and Anna Maria Gabriels, lady's maid of Maria Eleonora of Brandenburg. Düben was sent by his father to Germany for education in his youth. He was a student of Sweelinck.

Family 

In 1654, Düben married Dutch merchant's daughter Emerentia Standaert. They had at least nine children.

Career 

In 1647 Gustav became part of the Swedish royal court orchestra, the Kungliga Hovkapellet, where he would succeed as Hofkapellmeister in 1663 after the death of his father the previous year. Both of his sons would follow in their father's footsteps, Gustav (sv) holding the office from 1690 to 1698 and Anders (sv) from 1698 to 1726.

In addition to his court duties, he was organist at the German Church in Stockholm.

Düben composed a few works in the North German style prevalent in his time, including both vocal music and instrumental music.

However, these do not constitute the most important aspect of his contribution to music. From the 1640s, Düben begun compiling a manuscript collection of compositions from his time, some of which he had acquired from his travels in foreign lands. Named after him as the Düben collection, it is one of the most important sources for music of the 17th century, notably being the only surviving copy of many works by Dieterich Buxtehude.

See also 
Dieterich Buxtehude
Düben collection
Membra Jesu Nostri

References

Citations

Bibliography

Further reading

External links 
Mss. of works collected by the family, the "Düben collection"

1624 births
1690 deaths
17th-century classical composers
17th-century Swedish musicians
Swedish Baroque composers
Swedish classical composers
Swedish male classical composers
Swedish people of German descent
17th-century male musicians

Gustaf